Abisha Woodward (1752–1809), also known as Abashai Woodward, was an architect and contractor from New London, Connecticut that is best known for building lighthouses in the United States.  He oversaw the construction of many of Connecticut's earliest lighthouses, but also worked in New York and North Carolina during his career.  The oldest surviving beacon built by Woodward is the New London Harbor Lighthouse, which he completed in 1801.

Career 

Woodward distinguished himself in New London as a fine architect and contractor.  Prior to building lighthouses, he was co-named in a contract for building New London's new meetinghouse in 1788.  Home construction in town likely kept him busy around 1790, a time during which New London was experiencing significant growth.

Woodward's work on lighthouses began with a federal contract he won in 1793 to complete the Bald Head Light at Cape Fear, North Carolina, which was already partially constructed prior to his arrival.  He later submitted a bid in 1796 to build the Montauk Point Lighthouse, but lost the contract to John McComb. After the turn of the century, Woodward secured contracts to oversee the construction of five lighthouses along the Connecticut coast and one in New York on the east end of Long Island.

Woodward constructed both wooden and stone lighthouses during his career.  The last and longest-lived of his wooden lighthouses was replaced in 1841 after 36 years of service.  Two of Woodward's stone lighthouses, the New London Harbor Lighthouse completed in 1801 and the Faulkner's Island Lighthouse completed 1802, remain standing to this day and still serve as active aids to navigation.

Personal life 

Abisha Woodward was born in 1752 and married Mary Spicer on March 20, 1774.  He lived in New London, Connecticut where he was a prominent architect, contractor and alderman.  Several of his children were born in Preston, Connecticut, suggesting that he probably lived there for some time, as well.  Woodward owned extensive property in the southern states and bought some 4,000 acres of land in the north of Ohio, known at that time as the Firelands, to benefit the widows and orphans of Revolutionary War soldiers.  He died on April 10, 1809 in New London.

List of lighthouses constructed

References 

1752 births
1809 deaths
People from New London, Connecticut
Lighthouse builders
Architects from Connecticut
18th-century American architects
19th-century American architects